Sarqanat (also Romanized as Sarqanāt; also known as Sar Qanāt-e Harījān) is a village in Hamaijan Rural District, Hamaijan District, Sepidan County, Fars Province, Iran. At the 2006 census, its population was 18, in 6 families.

References 

Populated places in Sepidan County